The 2020–21 Indiana Pacers season was Indiana's 54th season as a franchise and 45th season in the NBA. The Pacers replaced Nate McMillan, with former Toronto Raptors assistant coach Nate Bjorkgren.

The Pacers missed the playoffs for the first time since 2015 following a loss to the Washington Wizards in the play-in tournament, ending a six-year playoff streak. Due to this, with multiple other factors, Bjorkgren was fired.

NBA draft

Entering the 2020 NBA draft, the Pacers only held one second-round pick. Their own first-round selection was traded as an incentive to acquire Malcolm Brogdon from the Milwaukee Bucks via sign and trade.

Roster

Standings

Division

Conference

Notes
 z – Clinched home court advantage for the entire playoffs
 c – Clinched home court advantage for the conference playoffs
 y – Clinched division title
 x – Clinched playoff spot
 * – Division leader

Game log

Preseason

Regular season

|-style="background:#cfc;"
| 1
| December 23
| New York
| 
| Domantas Sabonis (32)
| Domantas Sabonis (13)
| Malcolm Brogdon (8)
| Bankers Life Fieldhouse0
| 1–0
|-style="background:#cfc;"
| 2
| December 26
| @ Chicago
| 
| T. J. Warren (23)
| Domantas Sabonis (10)
| Domantas Sabonis (11)
| United Center0
| 2–0
|-style="background:#cfc;"
| 3
| December 27
| Boston
| 
| Malcolm Brogdon (25)
| Domantas Sabonis (10)
| T. J. McConnell (7)
| Bankers Life Fieldhouse0
| 3–0
|-style="background:#fcc;"
| 4
| December 29
| Boston
| 
| Victor Oladipo (24)
| Domantas Sabonis (11)
| Domantas Sabonis (8)
| Bankers Life Fieldhouse0
| 3–1
|-style="background:#cfc;"
| 5
| December 31
| Cleveland
| 
| Domantas Sabonis (25)
| Domantas Sabonis (11)
| Victor Oladipo (8)
| Bankers Life Fieldhouse0
| 4–1

|-style="background:#fcc;"
| 6
| January 2
| New York
| 
| Malcolm Brogdon (33)
| Domantas Sabonis (13)
| Malcolm Brogdon (7)
| Bankers Life Fieldhouse0
| 4–2
|-style="background:#cfc;"
| 7
| January 4
| @ New Orleans
| 
| Victor Oladipo (25)
| Domantas Sabonis (11)
| Malcolm Brogdon (11)
| Smoothie King Center0
| 5–2
|-style="background:#cfc;"
| 8
| January 6
| Houston
| 
| Malcolm Brogdon (35)
| Domantas Sabonis (12)
| Malcolm Brogdon (7)
| Bankers Life Fieldhouse0
| 6–2
|-style="background:#fcc;"
| 9
| January 9
| Phoenix
| 
| Domantas Sabonis (25)
| Domantas Sabonis (22)
| Malcolm Brogdon (9)
| Bankers Life Fieldhouse0
| 6–3
|-style="background:#fcc;"
| 10
| January 11
| @ Sacramento
| 
| Domantas Sabonis (28)
| Domantas Sabonis (11)
| Malcolm Brogdon (9)
| Golden 1 Center0
| 6–4
|-style="background:#cfc;"
| 11
| January 12
| @ Golden State
| 
| Myles Turner (22)
| Domantas Sabonis (14)
| Aaron Holiday (12)
| Chase Center0
| 7–4
|-style="background:#cfc;"
| 12
| January 14
| @ Portland
| 
| Malcolm Brogdon (25)
| Domantas Sabonis (15)
| T. J. McConnell (8)
| Moda Center0
| 8–4
|-style="background:#ccc;"
| –
| January 16
| @ Phoenix
| colspan="6" | Postponed (COVID-19) (Makeup date: March 13)
|-style="background:#fcc;"
| 13
| January 17
| @ L. A. Clippers
| 
| Doug McDermott (23)
| Domantas Sabonis (14)
| Malcolm Brogdon (8)
| Staples Center0
| 8–5
|-style="background:#fcc;"
| 14
| January 20
| Dallas
| 
| Malcolm Brogdon (26)
| Domantas Sabonis (10)
| T. J. McConnell (6)
| Bankers Life Fieldhouse0
| 8–6
|-style="background:#cfc;"
| 15
| January 22
| Orlando
| 
| Malcolm Brogdon (23)
| Domantas Sabonis (11)
| Domantas Sabonis (9)
| Bankers Life Fieldhouse0
| 9–6
|-style="background:#fcc;"
| 16
| January 24
| Toronto
| 
| Myles Turner (25)
| Domantas Sabonis (19)
| T. J. McConnell (7)
| Bankers Life Fieldhouse0
| 9–7
|-style="background:#cfc;"
| 17
| January 25
| Toronto
| 
| Malcolm Brogdon (36)
| Myles Turner (9)
| Brogdon, McConnell (9)
| Bankers Life Fieldhouse0
| 10–7
|-style="background:#cfc;"
| 18
| January 27
| @ Charlotte
| 
| Doug McDermott (28)
| Domantas Sabonis (11)
| Domantas Sabonis (10)
| Spectrum Center0
| 11–7
|-style="background:#fcc;"
| 19
| January 29
| @ Charlotte
| 
| Domantas Sabonis (22)
| Domantas Sabonis (11)
| Malcolm Brogdon (8)
| Spectrum Center0
| 11–8
|-style="background:#fcc;"
| 20
| January 31
| Philadelphia
| 
| Malcolm Brogdon (25)
| Domantas Sabonis (8)
| T. J. McConnell (8)
| Bankers Life Fieldhouse0
| 11–9

|-style="background:#cfc;"
| 21
| February 2
| Memphis
| 
| Domantas Sabonis (32)
| Domantas Sabonis (13)
| Brogdon, McConnell (8)
| Bankers Life Fieldhouse0
| 12–9
|-style="background:#fcc;"
| 22
| February 3
| @ Milwaukee
| 
| Domantas Sabonis (33)
| Domantas Sabonis (12)
| T. J. McConnell (12)
| Fiserv Forum0
| 12–10
|-style="background:#fcc;"
| 23
| February 5
| New Orleans
| 
| Justin Holiday (22) 
| J. Holiday, Lamb, McDermott, Sabonis, Turner (6)
| T. J. McConnell (15)
| Bankers Life Fieldhouse0
| 12–11
|-style="background:#fcc;"
| 24
| February 7
| Utah
| 
| Domantas Sabonis (20)
| Domantas Sabonis (9)
| Malcolm Brogdon (7)
| Bankers Life Fieldhouse0
| 12–12
|-style="background:#fcc;"
| 25
| February 10
| @ Brooklyn
| 
| Domantas Sabonis (18)
| Domantas Sabonis (9)
| Malcolm Brogdon (6)
| Barclays Center0
| 12–13
|-style="background:#cfc;"
| 26
| February 11
| @ Detroit 
|  
| Domantas Sabonis (26)
| Malcolm Brogdon (9)
| Domantas Sabonis (8)
| Little Caesars Arena0
| 13–13
|-style="background:#cfc;"
| 27
| February 13
| @ Atlanta
| 
| Doug McDermott (26)
| Domantas Sabonis (13)
| T. J. McConnell (12)
| State Farm Arena1,393
| 14–13
|-style="background:#fcc;"
| 28
| February 15
| Chicago
| 
| Domantas Sabonis (25)
| Malcolm Brogdon (15)
| Domantas Sabonis (5)
| Bankers Life Fieldhouse0
| 14–14
|-style="background:#cfc;"
| 29
| February 17
| @ Minnesota
| 
| Domantas Sabonis (36)
| Domantas Sabonis (17)
| Domantas Sabonis (10)
| Target Center0
| 15–14
|-style="background:#ccc;"
| –
| February 20
| @ Houston
| colspan="6" | Postponed (winter storm) (Makeup date: April 14)
|-style="background:#ccc;"
| –
| February 22
| San Antonio
| colspan="6" | Postponed (COVID-19) (Makeup date: April 19)
|-style="background:#fcc;"
| 30
| February 24
| Golden State
| 
| Malcolm Brogdon (24)
| Domantas Sabonis (16)
| T. J. McConnell (6)
| Bankers Life Fieldhouse0
| 15–15
|-style="background:#fcc;"
| 31
| February 26
| @ Boston
| 
| Domantas Sabonis (24)
| Myles Turner (10)
| Domantas Sabonis (9)
| TD Garden0
| 15–16
|-style="background:#fcc;"
| 32
| February 27
| @ New York
| 
| Doug McDermott (20)
| Domantas Sabonis (7)
| T. J. McConnell (12)
| Madison Square Garden1,981
| 15–17

|-style="background:#fcc;"
| 33
| March 1
| @ Philadelphia
| 
| Malcolm Brogdon (20)
| Domantas Sabonis (9)
| Domantas Sabonis (7)
| Wells Fargo Center0
| 15–18
|-style="background:#cfc;"
| 34
| March 3
| @ Cleveland
| 
| Malcolm Brogdon (29)
| Domantas Sabonis (5)
| T. J. McConnell (13)
| Rocket Mortgage FieldHouse2,720
| 16–18
|-style="background:#fcc;"
| 35
| March 4
| Denver
| 
| Myles Turner (22)
| Myles Turner (12)
| Domantas Sabonis (10)
| Bankers Life Fieldhouse0
| 16–19
|-style="background:#fcc;"
| 36
| March 12
| @ L. A. Lakers
| 
| Malcolm Brogdon (29)
| Domantas Sabonis (14)
| Domantas Sabonis (8)
| Staples Center0
| 16–20
|-style="background:#cfc;"
| 37
| March 13
| @ Phoenix
| 
| Malcolm Brogdon (25)
| Domantas Sabonis (13)
| Domantas Sabonis (10)
| Phoenix Suns Arena3,166
| 17–20
|-style="background:#fcc;"
| 38
| March 15
| @ Denver
| 
| Malcolm Brogdon (24)
| Sabonis, Turner (9)
| Domantas Sabonis (10)
| Ball Arena0
| 17–21
|-style="background:#fcc;"
| 39
| March 17
| Brooklyn
| 
| Malcolm Brogdon (24)
| Domantas Sabonis (11)
| Domantas Sabonis (11)
| Bankers Life Fieldhouse0
| 17–22
|-style="background:#cfc;"
| 40
| March 19
| @ Miami
| 
| Malcolm Brogdon (27)
| Domantas Sabonis (15)
| T. J. McConnell (15)
| American Airlines Arena0
| 18–22
|-style="background:#cfc;"
| 41
| March 21
| @ Miami
| 
| Domantas Sabonis (17)
| Domantas Sabonis (11)
| Malcolm Brogdon (10)
| American Airlines Arena0
| 19–22
|-style="background:#fcc;"
| 42
| March 22
| @ Milwaukee
| 
| Domantas Sabonis (22)
| Domantas Sabonis (9)
| T. J. McConnell (7)
| Fiserv Forum3,280
| 19–23
|-style="background:#cfc;"
| 43
| March 24
| Detroit
| 
| Caris LeVert (28)
| Domantas Sabonis (11)
| T. J. McConnell (5)
| Bankers Life Fieldhouse0
| 20–23
|-style="background:#cfc;"
| 44
| March 26
| @ Dallas
| 
| Brogdon, Sabonis (22)
| Domantas Sabonis (15)
| Domantas Sabonis (5)
| American Airlines Center4,132
| 21–23
|-style="background:#fcc;"
| 45
| March 29
| @ Washington
| 
| Domantas Sabonis (35)
| Domantas Sabonis (11)
| T. J. McConnell (9)
| Capital One Arena0
| 21–24
|-style="background:#fcc;"
| 46
| March 31
| Miami
| 
| Myles Turner (15)
| Domantas Sabonis (14)
| Caris LeVert (6)
| Bankers Life Fieldhouse0
| 21–25

|-style="background:#fcc;"
| 47
| April 2
| Charlotte
| 
| Caris LeVert (16)
| Domantas Sabonis (10)
| T. J. McConnell (7)
| Bankers Life Fieldhouse0
| 21–26
|-style="background:#cfc;"
| 48
| April 3
| @ San Antonio
| 
| Caris LeVert (26)
| Bitadze, Turner (7)
| Caris LeVert (9)
| AT&T Center3,276
| 22–26
|-style="background:#fcc;"
| 49
| April 6
| Chicago
| 
| Caris LeVert (10)
| Lamb, LeVert (6)
| Goga Bitadze (6)
| Bankers Life Fieldhouse0
| 22–27
|-style="background:#cfc;"
| 50
| April 7
| Minnesota
| 
| Aaron Holiday (22)
| Kelan Martin (6)
| T. J. McConnell (15)
| Bankers Life Fieldhouse0
| 23–27
|-style="background:#cfc;"
| 51
| April 9
| @ Orlando
| 
| Aaron Holiday (20)
| Domantas Sabonis (15)
| T. J. McConnell (9)
| Amway Center3,777
| 24–27
|-style="background:#cfc;"
| 52
| April 11
| @ Memphis
| 
| Caris LeVert (34)
| Malcolm Brogdon (29)
| Domantas Sabonis (18)
| FedEx Forum0
| 25–27
|-style="background:#fcc;"
| 53
| April 13
| L. A. Clippers
| 
| Malcolm Brogdon (29)
| Caris LeVert (26)
| Domantas Sabonis (20)
| Bankers Life Fieldhouse0
| 25–28
|-style="background:#cfc;"
| 54
| April 14
| @ Houston
| 
| Caris LeVert (27)
| Malcolm Brogdon (14)
| Malcolm Brogdon (9)
| Toyota Center3,293
| 26–28
|-style="background:#fcc;"
| 55
| April 16
| @ Utah
| 
| Caris LeVert (24)
| Domantas Sabonis (15)
| T. J. McConnell (8)
| Vivint Arena5,546
| 26–29
|-style="background:#fcc;"
| 56
| April 18
| @ Atlanta
| 
| Malcolm Brogdon (29)
| Domantas Sabonis (14)
| Malcolm Brogdon (8)
| State Farm Arena0
| 26–30
|-style="background:#fcc;"
| 57
| April 19
| San Antonio
| 
| Brogdon, LeVert (18)
| Goga Bitadze (9)
| Edmond Sumner (6)
| Bankers Life Fieldhouse0
| 26–31
|-style="background:#cfc;"
| 58
| April 21
| Oklahoma City
| 
| Malcolm Brogdon (29)
| Malcolm Brogdon (15)
| T. J. McConnell (8)
| Bankers Life Fieldhouse0
| 27–31
|-style="background:#cfc;"
| 59
| April 24
| Detroit
| 
| Malcolm Brogdon (26)
| Oshae Brissett (11)
| T. J. McConnell (13)
| Bankers Life Fieldhouse0
| 28–31
|-style="background:#cfc;"
| 60
| April 25
| @ Orlando
| 
| Malcolm Brogdon (24)
| Brissett, Brogdon (8)
| Malcolm Brogdon (9)
| Amway Center3,519
| 29–31
|-style="background:#fcc;"
| 61
| April 27
| Portland
| 
| Brissett, Brogdon (18)
| Oshae Brissett (10)
| T. J. McConnell (6)
| Bankers Life Fieldhouse0
| 29–32
|-style="background:#fcc;"
| 62
| April 29
| Brooklyn
| 
| Caris LeVert (36)
| Oshae Brissett (9)
| LeVert, McConnell (5)
| Bankers Life Fieldhouse 0
| 29–33

|-style="background:#cfc;"
| 63
| May 1
| @ Oklahoma City
| 
| Doug McDermott (31)
| Domantas Sabonis (19)
| Domantas Sabonis (14)
| Chesapeake Energy Arena0
| 30–33
|-style="background:#fcc;"
| 64
| May 3
| @ Washington
|  
| Caris LeVert (33)
| Domantas Sabonis (32)
| Justin Holiday (15)
| Capital One Arena0
| 30–34
|-style="background:#fcc;"
| 65
| May 5
| Sacramento
| 
| Caris LeVert (14)
| Domantas Sabonis (10)
| Domantas Sabonis (13)
| Bankers Life Fieldhouse0
| 30–35
|-style="background:#cfc;"
| 66
| May 6
| Atlanta
| 
| Domantas Sabonis (30)
| Brissett, Sabonis (8)
| Caris LeVert (12)
| Bankers Life Fieldhouse0
| 31–35
|-style="background:#fcc;"
| 67
| May 8
| Washington
| 
| Caris LeVert (35)
| Caris LeVert (14)
| Domantas Sabonis (13)
| Bankers Life Fieldhouse0
| 31–36
|-style="background:#cfc;"
| 68
| May 11
| @ Cleveland
| 
| Kelan Martin (25)
| Domantas Sabonis (20)
| Caris LeVert (10)
| Rocket Mortgage FieldHouse4,148
| 32–36
|-style="background:#cfc;"
| 69
| May 12
| Philadelphia
| 
| Caris LeVert (24)
| Domantas Sabonis (13)
| Domantas Sabonis (15)
| Bankers Life Fieldhouse0
| 33–36
|-style="background:#fcc;"
| 70
| May 14
| Milwaukee
| 
| Justin Holiday (26)
| Kelan Martin (9)
| Domantas Sabonis (14)
| Bankers Life Fieldhouse0
| 33–37
|-style="background:#fcc;"
| 71
| May 15
| L. A. Lakers
| 
| Caris LeVert (28)
| Goga Bitadze (7)
| Caris LeVert (12)
| Bankers Life Fieldhouse0
| 33–38
|-style="background:#cfc;"
| 72
| May 16
| @ Toronto
| 
| Oshae Brissett (31)
| Domantas Sabonis (16)
| T. J. McConnell (17)
| Amalie Arena0
| 34–38

Play-in

|-style="background:#cfc;"
| 1
| May 19
| Charlotte
| 
| Oshae Brissett (23)
| Domantas Sabonis (21)
| Domantas Sabonis (9)
| Bankers Life Fieldhouse0
| 1–0
|-style="background:#fcc;"
| 2
| May 21
| @ Washington
| 
| Malcolm Brogdon (24)
| Domantas Sabonis (11)
| Domantas Sabonis (10)
| Capital One Arena0
| 1–1

Player Statistics

Regular season

Player Statistics Citation:

Transactions

Trades

Free Agents

Additions

Subtractions

Notes

References

Indiana Pacers seasons
Indiana Pacers
Indiana Pacers
Indiana Pacers